OETF may refer to:

 Ta'if Regional Airport (ICAO code), Saudi Arabia
 Opto-electronic transfer function, in high dynamic range video